Mohammad Omri (born 11 March 2000) is an Iranian professional footballer who plays as a winger for Persian Gulf Pro League club Persepolis.

Club career

Persepolis
Mohammad Omri started his football career at Persepolis Club Academy.

In 2021, with the opinion of head coach Yahya Golmohammadi, Omri was added to the training sessions of the Persepolis adult team due to his brilliance in the Persepolis B team and being in the Top goalscorer Premier Youth League's course.

On January 13, 2022; He made his senior debut in a 1-0 home win over Fajrspasi in the league. Where in the 81st minute, he played as a substitute instead of Siamak Nemati.

On February 21, 2022; due to the satisfaction of the Coaching staff with his performance, with the official announcement of the Persepolis club website, his contract with the club was extended for 5 years until 2027.

Career statistics

Honours
Persepolis
Persian Gulf Pro League winner (1): 2020–21
Persian Gulf Pro League runner up (1): 2021–22
Iranian Super Cup winner (1): 2020
Iranian Super Cup runner up (1): 2021

References

External links

Mohammad Omri at Eurosport.com

Mohammad Omri at PersianLeague.com
Mohammad Omri at Footba11.co 

Living people
2000 births
Iranian footballers
Association football forwards
Persepolis F.C. players
Persian Gulf Pro League players
People from Urmia